Martial Saddier (born 15 October 1969 in Bonneville, Haute-Savoie) was member of the National Assembly of France from 2002 to 2021. He represented Haute-Savoie's 3rd constituency, as a member of the Republicans. In 2021 he left Parliament and became President of the Departmental Council of Haute-Savoie.

References

1959 births
Living people
People from Bonneville, Haute-Savoie
Union for a Popular Movement politicians
The Republicans (France) politicians
Deputies of the 12th National Assembly of the French Fifth Republic
Deputies of the 13th National Assembly of the French Fifth Republic
Deputies of the 14th National Assembly of the French Fifth Republic
Deputies of the 15th National Assembly of the French Fifth Republic
Regional councillors of Auvergne-Rhône-Alpes
Members of Parliament for Haute-Savoie